is the 35th single by Japanese singer/songwriter Chisato Moritaka. Written by Moritaka and Yuichi Takahashi, the single was released by One Up Music on March 4, 1998. The song was used in a Kanebo Sala shampoo commercial featuring Moritaka. The B-side is "Dragon", an instrumental track.

Music video 
The music video was filmed partially in London. It also features Moritaka playing the accordion solo.

Chart performance 
"Denwa" peaked at No. 17 on Oricon's singles chart and sold 58,000 copies.

Other versions 
Moritaka re-recorded the song and uploaded the video on her YouTube channel on July 31, 2013. This version is also included in Moritaka's 2014 self-covers DVD album Love Vol. 5.

Track listing

Personnel 
 Chisato Moritaka – vocals, drums, accordion, pianica
 Yuichi Takahashi – acoustic guitar, keyboard
 Shin Hashimoto – piano
 Yukio Seto – bass, percussion

Chart positions

References

External links 
 
 
 

1998 singles
1998 songs
Japanese-language songs
Chisato Moritaka songs
Songs with lyrics by Chisato Moritaka
One Up Music singles